Joseph Buller (1909–1986) was a footballer who played in the Football League for Aldershot, Hartlepools United and Stoke City.

Career
Born in Durham, Buller played for Chilton Colliery Recreation Athletic and Hartlepools United before joining Stoke City in 1932. He spent three seasons at the Victoria Ground making just seven appearances and left in 1935 to play for Aldershot.

Career statistics

Honours
Stoke City
 Football League Second Division champions: 1932–33

References

1909 births
1986 deaths
Sportspeople from Durham, England
Footballers from County Durham
English footballers
Association football wing halves
Chilton Colliery Recreation F.C. players
Stoke City F.C. players
Aldershot F.C. players
Hartlepool United F.C. players
English Football League players